This is a list of monuments that are classified by the Moroccan ministry of culture around Marrakesh.

Monuments and sites in Marrakesh 

|}

References 

Marrakesh
Marrakesh